Selibi Phikwe Government Hospital is a government-run district hospital located in Selebi Phikwe, is a mining town located in the Central District of Botswana. It had a population of 49,849 in 2001 which is now estimated to have risen to c.52000.

History 
Selibi Phikwe Government Hospital is a Government health institution founded in 1970. The institution is located at the central district of Botswana in a town called Selebi Phikwe.

References

External links 
 Botswana Ministry of Health

Hospital buildings completed in 1970
Hospitals in Botswana
Hospitals established in 1970